The 106th Independent Brigade of the Territorial Defense Forces is a military formation of the Territorial Defense Forces of Ukraine in Khmelnytskyi Oblast. It is part of Operational Command West.

History

Formation 
On 27 June 2018, the brigade was formed Khmelnytskyi Oblast. The brigade was planned to be composed of older reservists, with more than 2,000 of 41-50 year olds signing up. By November 2018, battalions were actively recruiting reservists.

In August 2019, the brigade held an exercise for 154 officers to increase overall efficiency of defending critical infrastructure, countering sabotage and reconnaissance units, and waging battles in cities and forests.

By mid-February 202, the Territorial Defense Battalion from Starokostiantyniv had filled 74% of its positions for officers, sergeants and soldiers. At the same time, residents of Slavuta began to organize their own battalion to add to those already serving in the Brigade.

Russo-Ukrainian War

2022 Russian invasion of Ukraine
Units of the Brigade took part in the Second Battle of Lyman, losing 9 soldiers.
In November, the 88th battalion from Shepetivka was serving in areas of Bakhmut and Sloviansk. On 5 December, the brigade's battle flag was created.  Units of the Brigade were deployed on the Zaporizhzhia frontline between Huliaipole-Polohy in December.

Structure 
As of 2022 the brigade's structure is as follows:
 Headquarters
 86th Territorial Defense Battalion (Khmelnytskyi) А7179
 87th Territorial Defense Battalion (Kamianets-Podilskyi) А7180
 88th Territorial Defense Battalion (Shepetivka) А7181
 89th Territorial Defense Battalion (Starokostiantyniv) А7182
 90th Territorial Defense Battalion (Yarmolyntsi) А7183
 91st Territorial Defense Battalion (Slavuta) А7184
 Counter-Sabotage Company
 Engineering Company
 Communication Company
 Logistics Company
 Mortar Battery

Commanders 
 Colonel Buhun Ihor 2019
 Colonel Bihus Valentyn 2021 - present

See also 
 Territorial Defense Forces of the Armed Forces of Ukraine

References 

Territorial defense Brigades of Ukraine
2018 establishments in Ukraine
Military units and formations established in 2018